The 1975 St. Louis Cardinals season was the team's 56th year with the National Football League and the 16th season in St. Louis. The club scored 356 points while the defense gave up 276 points. The team appeared in the playoffs for the second consecutive year, by winning the NFC East with a record of eleven wins and three losses. They never returned the playoffs during a full NFL season until 1998, by which time they moved from St. Louis to Arizona.

The team was nicknamed the “Cardiac Cards”, because eight of their games were decided in the final minute of play; the Cardinals went 7–1 in these games.

After this season, the Cardinals never reached the top of the NFC East again.  They would not again have a division title until 33 years later, after they had moved to Arizona, and later to the NFC West.

Offseason

NFL Draft

Roster

Regular season

Schedule

Standings

Game summaries

Week 1: vs. Atlanta Falcons

Postseason

NFC Divisional Playoff

Awards and records 
 Terry Metcalf, NFL Leader, 2,462 Combined Net Yards

Milestones 
 Terry Metcalf, Second Consecutive 2000 Combined Net Yards Season (816 Rush Yards, 378 Pass Receiving Yards, 285 Punt Return Yards, 960 Kick Return Yards, 23 fumble return yards)

References 

Sources
 Cardinals on Pro Football Reference
 Cardinals on jt-sw.com

St. Louis
Arizona Cardinals seasons
NFC East championship seasons